Reginald Samuel Sherard Statham OBE (11 March 1884 – 1959) was professor of gynaecology at the University of Bristol. 

He attended Bradfield College, and earned his medical degree (M.D. M.Ch.) from the University of Bristol. He served with the Royal Army Medical Corps during World War i at the Battle of Mons and the First Battle of Ypres, among other assignments, and achieved the rank of major. He was also twice mentioned in despatches. After the war he was appointed OBE for his military service.

He married Annie Maitland Sherwin; they had two children.

References

1884 births
1959 deaths
20th-century British medical doctors
Royal Army Medical Corps officers
British Army personnel of World War I
Members of the Order of the British Empire
Academics of the University of Bristol

Alumni of the University of Bristol
British gynaecologists